William Gamble may refer to:
William Gamble (general) (1818–1866), U.S. Army cavalry officer who fought at the Battle of Gettysburg
William Gamble (business) (1805–1881), Canadian merchant, miller, and pioneer
William R. Gamble (1850–1910), civil rights activist and barber in Nebraska
William Gamble (cricketer) (1798–1855), English cricketer
William Gamble of Procter and Gamble, son of James Gamble, co-founder of Procter and Gamble

See also
William Gambel (1823–1849), U.S. naturalist and collector